A Mine Action Coordination Centre is an agency established in a region under the auspices of the United Nations to coordinate the clearing of the explosive remnants of war - including landmines and unexploded ordnance.  The individual centres are commonly managed by the United Nations Office for Project Services (UNOPS) whereas global policy is in the remit of the United Nations Mine Action Service (UNMAS).

One of the major ones is UNMACC SL in Tyre, South Lebanon. Others exist in among other places Kabul, Afghanistan and Khartoum, Sudan.  
Previous locations include Baghdad, Iraq and Pristina, Kosovo.

External links
Official site

United Nations General Assembly subsidiary organs
Mine warfare and mine clearance organizations